Okolo is a surname. Notable people with the surname include:

Bartho Okolo, Nigerian biologist
Courtney Okolo (born 1994), American sprinter
Jude Thaddeus Okolo (born 1956), Nigerian bishop
Vera Okolo (born 1985), Nigerian footballer
Wendy Okolo, Nigerian-American aerospace research engineer